Barwedel is a municipality in the district of Gifhorn, in Lower Saxony, Germany.

References

Gifhorn (district)